Francisco de Miranda is a Venezuelan film on the life of Venezuelan independence hero Francisco de Miranda. It was released in Venezuela in August 2006, opening at forty cinemas, and beating Superman Returns at the box office.

Cast 
 Luis Fernández : Francisco de Miranda
 Ralph Kinnard : Pitt
 Luke Grande : Conde Floridablanca

See also
 Miranda Returns (2007), an unrelated film on Miranda released the following year

References

External links
 

2006 films
Venezuelan drama films
2000s Spanish-language films